Princess Somavadi Sriratanarajadhida, the Princess Samorarattanasirijeshtha (19 November 1852 - 4 May 1931) was a Princess of Siam (later  Thailand She was a member of Siamese royal family is a daughter of King Mongkut and Chao Chom Manda Tieng.

Her mother was Chao Chom Manda Tieng (is a daughter of Dis Rojanadis and Klai Rojanadis), She Was given full name as Phra Chao Borom Wong Ther Phra Ong Chao Somavadi Srirattanarajadhida Krom Luang Samorarattanasirijeshtha 
().

Princess Somavadi died on 4 May 1931 at the age 78.

References 

1852 births
1931 deaths
19th-century Thai women
19th-century Chakri dynasty
20th-century Thai women
20th-century Chakri dynasty
Thai female Phra Ong Chao
People from Bangkok
Children of Mongkut
Daughters of kings